The World Puzzle Championship (commonly abbreviated as WPC) is an annual international puzzle competition run by the World Puzzle Federation. All the puzzles in the competition are pure-logic problems  based on simple principles, designed to be playable regardless of language or culture.

National teams are determined by local affiliates of the World Puzzle Federation. Of the 26 championships (team category) held thus far, 14 have been won by the United States, 7 by Germany, 3 by the Czech Republic, and 2 by Japan. The most successful individual contestant is Ulrich Voigt (Germany) with 11 titles since 2000.

The latest WPC was held in October 2019 in Germany.

Origin 
The World Puzzle Championship was the brainchild of Levi Summers, who wanted to create an event where puzzlers from different countries could compete on an even playing field. Previously, the International Crossword Marathon was the major international competition for puzzle-solving, and Shortz had attended it every year, but because participants used their own language and crossword rules, it was not a very good basis for comparing raw puzzle-solving skills across cultures. Shortz created the WPC to overcome these flaws. As described by Nick Baxter, co-director of the U.S. Puzzle Championship, the challenge of the competition is speed.

The first WPC was held in New York City in 1992, and Shortz was the organizer and Helene Hovanec was the coordinator. Each WPC has been held at a different city since then.

Participants 
Currently, 34 countries are official members of the World Puzzle Federation. Individuals may also take part if their country is not already represented by a national team. In the 2017 WPC, 169 contestants from 27 countries participated. The United States has won the championship 14 times, followed by Germany with 7 championships. The Czech Republic has won three times and Japan has won twice. Ulrich Voigt of Germany has been the most successful individual contestant, winning the gold medal eleven times since 2000. Wei-Hwa Huang of the United States won four of the first eight championships in the 1990s.

Results summary

Age-restricted categories 
Starting from 2013, titles have been awarded also for the best players in two age categories, Under 18 and Over 50 years of age.

Classic puzzles used 

Incomplete list, in alphabetical order:

Balance
Battleship
Fillomino
Hitori
Kakuro
Nonogram
Number Link
Slitherlink
Sudoku and many variants

See also 
World Sudoku Championship
Nob Yoshigahara Puzzle Design Competition

References

External links 

Puzzle competitions